Bamble is a municipality in Vestfold og Telemark county, Norway. It is part of the traditional region of Grenland. The administrative centre of the municipality is the village of Langesund.

General information

Name
The Old Norse form of the name was Bamblar (a plural form). The name could be related to the word bembel m 'belly' (used in the meaning 'round hill/mountain'). The name was written "Bamle" in the period 1889–1917.

See also the name Bømlo.

Coat-of-arms
The coat-of-arms is from modern times. They were granted on 12 December 1986. The arms show a gold-colored ship's wheel on a blue background. The arms are nearly identical to the former arms of Stathelle, which along with Langesund was merged with the municipality of Bamble on 1 January 1964. Sailing and fishing have always been of great importance for the area, and a ship's wheel was thus an appropriate symbol.

History
The municipality of Bamble was established on 1 January 1838 (see formannskapsdistrikt). The lading place of Stathelle was separated from the municipality of Bamble in 1851. On 1 January 1964, the municipality of Bamble was merged with the neighboring municipalities of Stathelle and Langesund. The new municipality was named Bamble, the administrative centre was Langesund, and the coat-of-arms of Stathelle were used for the new municipality.

Bamble, lying at the southern tip of the Kongsberg-Bamble geological formation, also has a unique geology that has been extensively researched by geologists such as W. C. Brøgger. It exhibits a high grade gneiss terrane characterized by metasomatism. As such there have been many mines operating in the area, most notably the Ødegården Verk apatite mines and the nickel mines in Nystein.

Bamble Church (Bamble kirke) is located at E18 south of Grenland Bridge. It is a wooden cruciform church which was built in 1845. The church is located next to the ruins of Olav Church which dated to around 1145.

Twin towns – sister cities

Bamble is twinned with:
 Akranes, Iceland
 Närpes, Finland
 Tønder, Denmark
 Västervik, Sweden

Notable people 

 Marcus Olaus Bockman (1849 in Langesund – 1942) a Norwegian-American Lutheran theologian in Minnesota
 Marie Høeg (1866 in Langesund – 1949) a Norwegian photographer and suffragist
 William Houlder Zachariasen (1906 in Langesund – 1979) Norwegian-American physicist, pioneering specialist in X-ray crystallography and the structure of glass in Chicago
 Arne Selberg (1910 in Langesund – 1989) a civil engineer, designed suspension bridges
 Sigmund Selberg (1910–1994) a mathematician, worked on the distribution of prime numbers 
 Atle Selberg (1917 in Langesund – 2007) a mathematician, worked on analytic number theory 
 Kjell Bohlin (1928–2011) a Norwegian politician, Mayor of Bamble 1971 to 1981
 Turid Thomassen (born 1965 in Stathelle) leader of the Norwegian Red party 2010 to 2012
 Sverre Gjørvad (born 1966 in Stathelle) a Norwegian jazz musician (drums) and composer
 Odd Ivar Solvold (born 1969 in Bamble) a chef, restaurateur and author of cook books
 Jørn Lier Horst (born 1970 in Bamble) author of crime fiction and former Police officer
 Kenneth Nilsen (born 1994 in Bamble), stage name K-391, music producer

Sport 
 Thor Thorvaldsen (1909 in Bamble – 1987) a Norwegian sailor and twice Olympic champion
 Jan Halvor Halvorsen (born 1963 in Bamble) former footballer with 250 club caps and 5 for Norway
 Ella Gjømle Berg (born 1979 in Stathelle) a cross-country skier

References

External links

Municipal fact sheet from Statistics Norway

 
Municipalities of Vestfold og Telemark